Joshua Law Chi-kong (born 1957) is a Hong Kong government official. He was the Secretary for the Civil Service from July 2017 to April 2020.

He graduated from the St Peter's College, Oxford University where he read PPE. He joined the Administrative Service in September 1980. He served in many bureaux and departments, such as Urban Services Department, Office of the Unofficial Members of the Executive and Legislative Councils, the City and New Territories Administration. He also worked at the Hong Kong Economic and Trade Office in New York, the Lands and Works Branch, the Works Branch, the Constitutional Affairs Branch, the Civil Service Branch, the Education and Manpower Branch and the Chief Executive's Office. 

He was appointed Director-General of Trade, later renamed Director-General of Trade and Industry, from August 1999 to September 2002, followed by the positions of the permanent representative to the World Trade Organization from September 2002 to August 2004, and Permanent Secretary for the Environment, Transport and Works (Transport) from August 2004 to July 2007. He rose to his present rank of Administrative Officer Staff Grade A1 in September 2005. Law was also Permanent Secretary for Constitutional and Mainland Affairs since July 2007. From July 2012, he was appointed Permanent Secretary for Security.

In July 2017, he was appointed to Secretary for the Civil Service by Chief Executive Carrie Lam and served until a cabinet reshuffle in April 2020.

References

Living people
1957 births
Government officials of Hong Kong
Hong Kong civil servants
Members of the Executive Council of Hong Kong
Recipients of the Gold Bauhinia Star
Hong Kong people of Hakka descent
People from Huiyang
Alumni of St Peter's College, Oxford